The Arado W 2 was a two-seat twin-engine seaplane trainer developed for the DVS in 1928. It was a cantilever monoplane with a fabric-covered steel tube fuselage that accommodated the pilot and instructor in tandem open cockpits. The undercarriage consisted of two pontoons carried on steel struts.

Specifications

References

Further reading
 
 World Aircraft Information Files. Brightstar Publishing, London. File 889 Sheet 73

External links
 German Aircraft between 1919 – 1945

W 2
1920s German civil trainer aircraft
Vehicles introduced in 1928